The 1933–34 Cupa României was the inaugural season of the Romania's most prestigious football (soccer) cup competition.

In order to promote the competition and encourage clubs to register to the cup, no taxes were enforced on the participants. From the sixty-eight teams registered for the competition, fifty-two were not competing in the top-flight.

The competition started in the autumn of 1933. The first phases involved only teams coming from district leagues. The draws were made taking in account logistic difficulties, and sixteen of these clubs advanced to the first round proper, where they were joined by the sixteen teams from Diviza A. The results of the preliminary phase were not recorded.

The first winners were Ripensia Timișoara, who defeated Universitatea Cluj in the final. The trophy was handed by Alexandru Vaida-Voevod to the captain of Ripensia, Silviu Bindea.

First edition of Romanian Cup debuted on 6 April 1931 and it was reserved just for teams of League. After it disputed two editions, both won by the team of North League which defeated in final the teams of South League and East League, on 24 September 1933 it started a new competition with a formula which is today too. Number of teams extended from 65 at first edition, to 4.129 in season 1964–1965. From the first edition, the teams from Divizia A entered in competition in sixteen finals, rule which remained till today.

Format
The competition is an annual knockout tournament with pairings for each round drawn at random.

There are no seeds for the draw. The draw also determines which teams will play at home. Each tie is played as a single leg.

If a match is drawn after 90 minutes, the game goes in extra time, and if the scored is still tight after 120 minutes, there a replay will be played, usually at the ground of the team who were away for the first game.

From the first edition, the teams from Divizia A entered in competition in sixteen finals, rule which remained till today.

The format is almost similar with the oldest recognised football tournament in the world FA Cup.

Bracket

First round proper

|-
|colspan=3 style="background-color:#FFCCCC;"|31 March 1934

|-
|colspan=3 style="background-color:#FFCCCC;"|1 April 1934

{{OneLegResult|Vulturii Textila Lugoj (District)||1–2|(Div. A) AMEF Arad||}}

|-
|colspan=3 style="background-color:#FFCCCC;"|22 April 1934|-
|colspan=3 style="background-color:#FFCCCC;"|29 April 1934 — Replay|}

Notes
Note 1: The match was contested and it was replayed.

Second round proper

|-
|colspan=3 style="background-color:#FFCCCC;"|9 April 1934|-
|colspan=3 style="background-color:#FFCCCC;"|29 March 1934|-
|colspan=3 style="background-color:#FFCCCC;"|1 May 1934|-
|colspan=3 style="background-color:#FFCCCC;"|6 May 1934|-
|colspan=3 style="background-color:#FFCCCC;"|13 May 1934|}

Quarter-finals

|colspan=3 style="background-color:#FFCCCC;"|17 May 1934|}

Semi-finals

|colspan=3 style="background-color:#FFCCCC;"|17 June 1934'''

|}

Final

Replay

References

External links
romaniansoccer.ro

Cupa României seasons
Cupa
Romania